Comcast Ventures was a corporate venture capital firm headquartered in San Francisco, California.

History
In early 2011, Comcast and NBCUniversal combined their two venture arms, Comcast Interactive Capital founded in 1999 and the Peacock Fund, to form Comcast Ventures. 

In 2012, Comcast Ventures set up the Catalyst Fund with $20 million under management to invest in underrepresented entrepreneurs. In January 2020, NBA Champion Andre Iguodala joined the Catalyst Fund as a Venture Partner.

In November 2020, Comcast announced its venture arm would be folded into the corporate business division led by Sam Schwartz. Between 2011 and 2020, Amy Banse was the Managing Director and Head of Funds. The firm’s partners also included Gil Beyda, Andrew Cleland, Sam Landman, Dinesh Moorjani, Rick Prostko, Dave Zilberman, Daniel Gulati, and Kim Armor.

Investments
Comcast has been ranked the 4th Corporate Startup Investor in the World. In the past six years up to 2017, the corporation had invested in 105 early-stage companies. These companies include Away (luggage), CloudPassage, Dandelion Energy FanDuel, Quantifind, Slack Technologies, Vox Media, Yieldmo, and ZeroFox.

References

External links
 Comcast Ventures website

Financial services companies established in 1999
Venture capital firms of the United States
Companies based in San Francisco
Comcast subsidiaries
1999 establishments in California